Slobodanka Čolović-Maričić (born 10 January 1965 in Čepin) is a retired Croatian middle-distance runner who specialised in the 800 metres. She represented Yugoslavia at the 1988 Summer Olympics finishing fourth, as well as one outdoor and one indoor World Championships where she also made the final. In addition she won medals at the Mediterranean Games was the 1987 Universiade champion.

International competitions

Personal bests
Outdoor
400 metres – 52.32 (Sarajevo 1988)
800 metres – 1:56.51 (Belgrade 1987)
1500 metres – 4:09.14 (Celje 1987)
3000 metres – 9:19.70 (Belgrade 1989)
Indoor
800 metres – 1:59.83 (Budapest 1987)

References

1965 births
Living people
Yugoslav female middle-distance runners
Croatian female middle-distance runners
Olympic athletes of Yugoslavia
World Athletics Championships athletes for Yugoslavia
Athletes (track and field) at the 1988 Summer Olympics
Universiade medalists in athletics (track and field)
People from Osijek-Baranja County
Mediterranean Games gold medalists for Yugoslavia
Mediterranean Games silver medalists for Yugoslavia
Mediterranean Games bronze medalists for Yugoslavia
Mediterranean Games medalists in athletics
Athletes (track and field) at the 1983 Mediterranean Games
Athletes (track and field) at the 1987 Mediterranean Games
Universiade gold medalists for Yugoslavia
Medalists at the 1987 Summer Universiade